Bonden is a hill in Buskerud, Norway. It is located to the border with Telemark and the municipalities of Siljan and Skien.

The name
The name is the finite form of farmer (bonde), so the literal meaning is the farmer.

References

Mountains of Viken